Ammon is an unincorporated community in Bladen County, North Carolina, United States. It is located on NC 242, southwest of Ammon Ford.

References

Unincorporated communities in Bladen County, North Carolina
Unincorporated communities in North Carolina